Charles Gordon Perry Sr. (March 18, 1903 – September 19, 2003) was a star football player in  the Canadian Football League for the Montreal AAA Winged Wheelers. He was inducted into the Canadian Football Hall of Fame in 1970 and into the Canada's Sports Hall of Fame in 1975.

A multi-sport athlete, Perry was also a life member and past president of the Ottawa Curling Club. Since 1961, the club has held the year-ending "Gordie Perry Bonspiel" in his honour. Perry, nicknamed the "Galloping Ghost" also played baseball.

References
 Canada's Sports Hall of Fame profile

External links

References

1903 births
2003 deaths
Sportspeople from Moncton
Players of Canadian football from New Brunswick
Canadian Football Hall of Fame inductees
Canadian centenarians
Curlers from New Brunswick
Men centenarians
Curlers from Ottawa